Harihar Dham temple, commonly known as Harihar Dham located in Bagodar,  Giridih, of Indian state of Jharkhand has the distinction of having Shivalinga.

Location
Harihar Dham is located at 1  km from Grand Trunk Road at Bagodar 60 km South west of the Giridih district headquarters in the North Chotanagpur division of the state of Jharkhand, India.

Giridih was earlier a part of Hazaribagh district, of former undivided Bihar state. Giridih was later made a separate district and a part of the state of Jharkhand.

Description

It took around 30 years to complete the construction of the huge Shivling. The temple is a major tourist spot and is visited by devotees from all over India every year on Shravan Poornima to worship Lord Shiva.
Shravan Poornima is the full moon night in the holy month of Shraavana. It is the month of festivals and pious rituals. On the fifth day of the bright half of the holy month of Shraavana the ritual of worshiping a cobra popularly known as  Nag Panchami is celebrated.
Owing to its religious importance Harihar Dham is also a popular place for marriage for people of the Hindu religion.

References

External links
 Official website of the Giridih district
 Photos of Harihar Dham
 Harihar Dham, Giridih at Indiavideo.org

 Photo of Shivling temple of Harihar dham
 Photo2 of Shivling temple of Harihar dham
 Harihar Dham at Wikimapia

Hindu temples in Jharkhand
Shiva temples in Jharkhand
Giridih district
Colossal statues in India
Shiva temples in India